Christian Miotello is an Italian motorcycle speedway rider who is a member of Italy's national team. Miotello started at 2007 Italian Grand Prix

Career details 
 Individual Speedway World Championship (Speedway Grand Prix)
 2007 - 36th place (0 points in one event)
 Team World Championship (Speedway World Team Cup and Speedway World Cup)
 2001 - 3rd place in Preliminary round 1
 2003 - 12th place
 2005 - 4th place in Qualifying round 2
 2006 - 4th place in Qualifying round 2
 Individual Italian Championship
 1998 - 12th place (15 pts)
 1999 - 11th place (43 pts)
 2000 - 7th place (65 pts)
 2001 - 5th place (61 pts)
 2002 - 5th place (72 pts)
 2003 - 5th place (41 pts)
 2004 - 5th place (26 pts)
 2005 - 6th place (53 pts)
 2006 - 5th place (34 pts)
 2007 - 7th place (21 pts)
 2008 - 13th place (11 pts)
 Individual Junior Italian Championship
 1998 - 5th place (44 pts)
 2000 - Runner-up (123 pts)
 2001 - Italian Champion (100 pts)

 Individual Speedway Argentine Championship (Team Punta Alta)

See also 
 Italy national speedway team
 List of Speedway Grand Prix riders

References 

Living people
Italian speedway riders

Year of birth missing (living people)